Hiram Collins Haydn (November 3, 1907 – December 2, 1973) was an American writer and editor. He was editor in chief at Random House before leaving to help establish Atheneum Publishing. He was also the editor of Phi Beta Kappa's literary journal, The American Scholar, from 1944 to 1973.

Biography
Born in Cleveland, Ohio, Haydn graduated from Amherst College in 1928, and later received a master's degree from Western Reserve University and a Ph.D. from Columbia University in 1942.  He married Rachel Hutchinson Norris in 1935, later divorced; in 1945 he married Mary Wescott Tuttle. mother's maiden middle name: spelling correction.

In 1945 Haydn became editor, later editor in chief, for Crown Publishers until he moved to Bobbs-Merrill in 1950 and to Random House in 1955, where he became editor in chief in 1956. In 1959 he became one of the founders of Atheneum together with Simon Bessie and Alfred Knopf Jr.  He left in 1964 to join Harcourt, Brace & World.

Among the writers he worked with as editor were William Styron, William Goldman, William Faulkner, and Ayn Rand.

He wrote five novels, as well as an academic work about the "counter revolution" that he argued took place during the middle period of the Renaissance. His memoir, Words & Faces, was published posthumously.  During his career he also taught at several colleges including the University of North Carolina, The New School for Social Research, the Center for Advanced Study at Wesleyan University, and the Annenberg School for Communication at the University of Pennsylvania.

Haydn had a seasonal home in Chilmark, Massachusetts, on Martha's Vineyard, where he died of a heart attack in December 1973 at age 66.  He was survived by his wife Mary, two sons, and two daughters.

Books

Novels
By Nature Free (1943)
Manhattan Furlough (1945)
The Time is Noon (1948)
The Hands of Esau (1962)
Report from the Red Windmill (1967)

History
The Counter-Renaissance (1950)

Memoir
Words & Faces (1974)

References

American book editors
1907 births
1973 deaths
Writers from Cleveland
Amherst College alumni
Case Western Reserve University alumni
Columbia University alumni
People from Chilmark, Massachusetts